Charles Munn (March 17, 1887 in Osseo, Minnesota – January 31, 1973) was a Minnesota Farmer-Laborite politician and a Speaker of the Minnesota House of Representatives. He was elected to the Minnesota House of Representatives in 1926, and originally caucused with the Conservative Caucus in the then-nonpartisan body. He later joined the Liberal Caucus, and in 1933, he became the first Farmer-Laborite to be elected speaker, a position he held for two years. In 1934, he was elected to the Railroad and Warehouse Commission.

References

1887 births
1973 deaths
People from Osseo, Minnesota
Farmers from Minnesota
Speakers of the Minnesota House of Representatives
Members of the Minnesota House of Representatives
20th-century American politicians